Salfords  ) is a village in the borough of Reigate and Banstead in Surrey, England. The village is within the civil parish of Salfords and Sidlow which covers a population of 3,069, and has a parish council.

Etymology of the place-name
Salfords means "willow-tree ford" from Old English sealh/salh "willow" and ford "ford. The name was recorded Selefrid in 1193. This is similar to the derivation of Salford, Greater Manchester.

Description
The village has its own 20th century church, Christ The King, primary school, cricket club, some shops, cafes, a social club, a tanning salon, a number of restaurants and a take away. Salfords Stream runs through the village and can cause flooding in the autumn and winter months. The southern boundary is marked by the Burstow stream.  Both are minor River Mole tributaries, itself a tributary of the River Thames.  The only buildings old enough to be listed structures in the village are two adjoining houses on Brighton Road and The Mill House Hotel on the Salfords Stream.

The village once boasted a wooden watermill with two sluice gates next to the Mill House Hotel. It produced breakfast cereals in the early twentieth century. By the 1950s it was defunct and has since been dismantled and partly washed away.

Salfords made the national news in January 2008 when a farmer named Robert Fidler built a personal home at Honeycrock Farm similar in style to a Tudor castle and disguised it with hay bales and tarpaulin for four years in an attempt to avoid planning permission from Surrey County Council.

Surrey Police applied for planning permission in 2010 for permission to build a 30-cell custody suite at the IO business centre to replace the existing facility at Reigate. This was extremely unpopular with the residents who packed out two meetings with Surrey Police in the local village hall to air their concerns over increases in crime and traffic, resulting in the first meeting being postponed to a larger venue. Surrey Police continued with the planning application despite the overwhelming opposition of the community, but the application was subsequently refused by Reigate and Banstead Council in June 2010. Surrey Police announced in December that they were appealing the decision; this has now been referred to the Planning Inspectorate.

Subsequently the Planning Inspectorate decided to ignore the wishes of both the local community and the council and have granted permission to Surrey Police to build the facility to a revised design.

History

Until the 1970s Salfords was part of Horley and with its own Victorian Chapel Church, owing its existence to the construction of the A23 road. The original trackway passed just to the east, on the other side of what is now the London to Brighton railway, dated as pre medieval.
This trackway came from Redhill, passing in front of the Royal Earlswood Hospital, through Whitebushes and crossing the stream/river 'Sal' at Dean Farm, Salfords. It then ran in front of the former Monotype Corporation site towards the Horley gasometer, passed the moated Thunderfield Castle (a 13th-century manor) on 'Harolds Lea' and reached the south coast near Brighton.

In the 1870s a state school was built on the fork between the London Road and Woodhatch Road on Petridge Common. The school consisted of four classrooms three were divided by sliding glass doors. The head teacher was located upstairs above the cloakrooms. In World War II two air raid shelters were built on opposite sides of the long tapering playground. In the mid-1950s the then "Salfords County Primary School" started to expand and relocated to Copsleigh Avenue.

The railway station was built in 1915 to enable workers access to the Monotype Corporation factory. Today it is served by London Bridge/London Victoria to Horsham trains. On the main road Hall & Co, the dominant building materials supplier in the south east of England had their regional maintenance depot, used in WWII to repair war tanks.

Cricket club

Salfords Cricket Club is a village cricket club.  The club runs two Saturday League sides in the Surrey Downs League and a Sunday friendly side.  The club host a "Cricket Week" of mid-week games each July, and a tour every August. The club now play on a council-owned ground on Petridge Wood Common, off Woodhatch Road. Salfords Cricket Club was formed in 1921. The Club's first captain was Tom Enever, whose photograph can be seen in the pavilion today. The Council relocated the club to its present ground at Petridge Wood Common in 1960.

See also
List of places of worship in Reigate and Banstead

References

External links

Villages in Surrey
Reigate and Banstead